Cigognola is a comune (municipality) in the Province of Pavia in the Italian region Lombardy, located about 50 km south of Milan and about 20 km southeast of Pavia.

Cigognola borders the following municipalities: Broni, Canneto Pavese, Castana, Pietra de' Giorgi.

References

Cities and towns in Lombardy